Marušič is a Slovene matronymic surname, mostly present in western Slovenia (the Slovenian Littoral) and in the Slovene-inhabited areas of Friuli Venezia Giulia, Italy. The name derives from the female personal name Maruša, which is a diminutive of Marija, Mary. The surname thus means something like "the descendant of Mary", or "the one from Mary's family".

It may refer to:
Andrej Marušič, Slovenian psychiatrist
Branko Marušič, Slovenian historian
Dorjan Marušič, Slovenian physician and politician, Minister of Health of Slovenia
Dragan Marušič, Slovenian mathematician
Drago Marušič, Yugoslav politician
Fedja Marušič, Slovenian sportsman
Fran Marušič, Anti-Fascist activist, member of the TIGR organization
Ivan Marušič, Slovenian architect
Lovrenc Marušič, Slovene 18th century monk and playwright
Tomaž Marušič, Slovenian politician

A variant of the surname is Marussig. For example:
 Piero Marussig, Italian painter

References 

Slovene-language surnames
Matronymic surnames